Thornton is an unincorporated community and coal town in Letcher County, Kentucky, United States. Their post office closed in November 2008

References

Unincorporated communities in Letcher County, Kentucky
Unincorporated communities in Kentucky
Coal towns in Kentucky